Fernando Clemente (1917–1998) was an architect and urbanist born in Sassari, Sardinia, Italy.

Main projects

 New and old skyscraper, (1952–1965), Sassari
 District of Latte Dolce, Sassari
 Faculty of Veterinary, 1966, Parma
 Faculty of Agrarian Studies, 1967, Sassari

Writings
Clemente, Fernando, La pianificazione territoriale in Sardegna, Gallizzi, Sassari, 1964.
Clemente, Fernando, Un'esperienza di prefabbricazione pesante nell'edilizia, Gallizzi, Sassari, 1965.
Clemente Fernando (editor), Pianificazione del territorio e sistema informativo, Angeli, Milano, 1984.
Clemente Fernando (editor), Cultura del paesaggio e metodi del territorio, Janus, Cagliari, 1987.

References 

Lucchini M., L'identità molteplice. Architettura contemporanea in Sardegna dal 1930 al 2008, Aìsara, Cagliari, 2009.
Zoppi C., Alcune riflessioni sull'opera di Fernando Clemente nel quadro recente della pianificazione del territorio in Sardegna, in Etica e pianificazione spaziale. Scritti in onore di Fernando Clemente, Angeli, Milano, 2000, pp. 364–382.

1917 births
1998 deaths
20th-century Italian architects
Architects from Sardinia